The Valleys Beyond is an Australian novel by E. V. Timms. It was the fourth in his Great South Land Saga of novels.

The novel is set in 1851 and features a number of real life figures as characters including Caroline Chisolm.

The novel was adapted for radio by the ABC in 1953.

References

External links
The Valleys Beyond at AustLit

1951 Australian novels
Fiction set in 1851
Novels set in the 1850s
Angus & Robertson books